A resource is a source or supply from which benefit is produced, typically but not necessarily of limited availability.

Resource may also refer to:

Natural resources, anything obtained from the environment to satisfy human needs and wants
Water resources, sources of water that are useful or potentially useful

Resource (biology), substances or objects required by a biological organism for normal maintenance, growth, and reproduction

Resource (economics), commodity, service, or other asset used in production of goods and services, including
Human resources (HR), skills, energies, talents, abilities, and knowledge used for production
Resource (project management), economic resources used in planning of tasks

Resource (computing), physical or virtual entities of limited availability (e.g., memory, processing capacity, and network speed), including
Computational resource, resource used for solving a computational problem
Web resource, anything identified by a Uniform Resource Identifier which can be found in a certain location
Resource fork, data associated with a Mac OS file
Resource (Windows), data embedded in EXE and DLL files
Resource (Java), application data
Resource (band), a former German electronic dance group